The 2014 NCAA Division I men's soccer tournament is the 56th annual edition of the NCAA Division I Men's Soccer Championship tournament. The brackets for the tournament were announced on November 17, 2014, with each of the 48 participating teams gaining an invitation through either an automatic or at-large bid determined by the NCAA. The First, Second, Third, and Quarterfinal Rounds were held at college campus sites across the United States determined by seeding and record. The four team College Cup finals tournament were held at WakeMed Soccer Park in Cary, North Carolina on December 12 and 14, 2014.

The Virginia Cavaliers won their seventh NCAA Championship title, defeating UCLA and avenging their loss to the Bruins in the championship game of the 1997 College Cup.

Qualified Teams

A total of 48 teams qualified into the tournament proper, either automatically, or through an at-large bid that is determined by a selection committee. Each conference that field varsity soccer teams is awarded one automatic berth into the tournament. Depending on the conference, that automatic berth was either given the champions of the regular season, or the tournament that culminates the regular season. Twenty-four teams earned automatic bids into the tournament, while 24 entered through an at-large bid.

Of the 23 schools that had previously won the championship, 13 qualified for the 2014 tournament.

Format 
Like previous editions of the NCAA Division I Tournament, the tournament featured 48 participants out of a possible field of 200 teams. Of the 48 berths, 24 were allocated to the conference tournament or regular season winners. The remaining 24 berths were supposed to be determined through an at-large process based upon the Ratings Percentage Index (RPI) of teams that did not automatically qualify.

The NCAA Selection Committee also named the top sixteen seeds for the tournament, with those teams receiving an automatic bye into the second round of the tournament. The remaining 32 teams played in a single-elimination match in the first round of the tournament for the right to play a seeded team in the second round.

Seeded teams 

 Automatic A = Conference tournament winner.
 Automatic B = Conference regular season champion, conference has no tournament.

Schedule

Bracket

Regional 1

Regional 2

Regional 3

Regional 4

 Coastal Carolina at Clemson was rescheduled for Monday the 24th due to inclement weather and unplayable field conditions,

College Cup – WakeMed Soccer Park, Cary, North Carolina

Results

First round

Second round

Third round

Quarterfinals

College Cup

Semifinals

Championship

Statistics

Goalscorers
4 goals
 Andy Craven — North Carolina

3 goals

 Rob Lovejoy — North Carolina
 Tyler Engel — North Carolina
 Mac Steeves — Providence

2 goals

 Sidney Rivera — Old Dominion
 Dominik Machado — Providence
 Cameron Iwasa — UC Irvine
 Chase Gaspar — UCLA
 Brian Iloski — UCLA
 Larry Ndjock — UCLA
 Leo Stolz — UCLA
 Will Walker — Xavier

1 goal

 Adam Najem — Akron
 Ian Ramos — Cal State Fullerton
 Stefano Bonomo — California
 Connor Hallisey — California
 Bobby Sekine — California
 Diego Campos — Clemson
 Paul Clowes — Clemson
 Kyle Fisher — Clemson
 Tommy Gudmundsson — Coastal Carolina
 Martin Melchor — Coastal Carolina
 Fernando Castellanos — Creighton
 Fabian Herbers — Creighton
 Lucas Stauffer — Creighton
 Alex Adelabu — Dartmouth
 Robin Alnas — Dartmouth
 Christopher Bazzini — Fordham
 Lewis Hawke — Furman
 Brandon Allen — Georgetown
 Arun Basuljevic — Georgetown
 Austin Martz — Georgetown
 Jared Rist — Georgetown
 Keegan Rosenberry — Georgetown
 Jhevaughn Beckford — Hartwick
 Grant Lillard — Indiana
 Andrew Brody — Louisville
 Tim Kübel — Louisville
 Zach Carroll — Michigan State
 Jay Chapman — Michigan State
 Tim Kreutz — Michigan State
 Adam Montague — Michigan State
 Emmanuel Agyemang — Monmouth
 Omar Holness — North Carolina
 Glen Long — North Carolina
 Alan Winn — North Carolina
 Brandon Aubrey — Notre Dame
 Jon Gallagher — Notre Dame
 Cody Archibald — Oakland
 Gavin Hoy — Oakland
 Kyle Culbertson — Ohio State
 Danny Jensen — Ohio State
 Ryan Condotta — Old Dominion
 Jordan Jones — Oregon State
 Brett Gravatt — Penn State
 Connor Maloney — Penn State
 Mikey Minutillo — Penn State
 Fabio Machado — Providence
 Markus Naglestad — Providence
 Daniel Neustädter — Providence
 Kingsley Bryce — Saint Louis
 Robert Kristo — Saint Louis
 Francisco Vizcaino — Saint Louis
 Dave Musambi — San Diego
 Parker Price — San Diego
 Keegan Smith — San Diego
 Paul Scheipeter — SIU Edwardsville
 Øyvind Alseth — Syracuse
 Emil Ekblom — Syracuse
 Alex Halis — Syracuse
 Ian Svantesson — UAB
 Dennis Martinez — UC Irvine
 Michael Sperber — UC Irvine
 Christian Chavez — UCLA
 Abu Danladi — UCLA
 Jordan Vale — UCLA
 Malcolm Harris — UMBC
 Mamadou Kansaye — UMBC
 Daniel Escobar — UNC Wilmington
 Kalvin Kromer — UNC Wilmington
 David Sizemore — UNC Wilmington
 Nicko Corriveau — Virginia
 Sam Heyward — Virginia
 Darius Madison — Virginia
 Kyle McCord — Virginia
 Jake Rozhansky — Virginia
 Todd Wharton — Virginia
 James Moberg — Washington
 Steven Wright — Washington
 Cory Brown — Xavier
 Alex Ridsdale — Xavier
 Matt Vasquenza — Xavier

Own goals

 Raby George — North Carolina (playing against Charlotte)
 Garrett Jackson — Washington (playing against Michigan State)
Georgetown (playing against Old Dominion)

References 

Tournament
NCAA Division I Men's Soccer Tournament seasons
NCAA
NCAA Division I men's soccer tournament
NCAA Division I men's soccer tournament
NCAA Division I men's soccer tournament